Massachusetts has had a number of semi-finalist placings but is not one of the most successful states at Miss Teen USA. Their best placement was in 2001, when Marianna Zaslavsky placed 2nd runner-up to Marissa Whitley.

The most notable Miss Massachusetts Teen USA is Susie Castillo, who went on to win the Miss Massachusetts USA and Miss USA crowns. She is one of three Massachusetts teens to win the respective Miss title. One other Teen also competed at Miss America. 

Yanelyn Quintana of Haverhill was crowned Miss Massachusetts Teen USA 2023 on January 29, 2023. She will represent Massachusetts for the title of Miss Teen USA 2023.

Results summary

Placements
2nd runners-up: Marianna Zaslavsky (2001)
3rd runners-up: Jacqueline Bruno (2003)
4th runners-up: Sophie Baird (2015)
Top 10: Kristen Mastroianni (1987), Jessica Gregory (1997)
Top 12: Nina Cammarata (1990), Erinn Bartlett (1991)
Top 15: Caroline Lunny (2008), Bailey Medeiros (2014), Annie Lu (2019)
Massachusetts holds a record of 10 placements at Miss Teen USA.

Awards
Best State Costume: Christine Lawlor (1983)
Style Award: Susie Castillo (1998)

Winners 

1 Age at the time of the Miss Teen USA pageant

References

External links
Official website

Massachusetts
Women in Massachusetts